Deb Murrell (born 24 July 1966) is a British cyclist. She competed in the women's cross-country mountain biking event at the 1996 Summer Olympics.

References

External links
 

1966 births
Living people
British female cyclists
Olympic cyclists of Great Britain
Cyclists at the 1996 Summer Olympics
People from Ditchingham